Kepler-438 is a red dwarf in the constellation Lyra, about 640 light years from Earth. It is notable for its planetary system, which includes Kepler-438b, a possibly Earth-size planet within Kepler-438's habitable zone.

Planetary system
The system has one confirmed planet however transit timing observations of Kepler-438b indicate the possible presence of additional planets.

References

External links
NASA's Kepler Marks 1,000th Exoplanet Discovery, Uncovers More Small Worlds in Habitable Zones

Lyra (constellation)
M-type main-sequence stars
Planetary systems with one confirmed planet
TIC objects